Samsung Galaxy J5 Pro is an Android smartphone, developed by Samsung Electronics for its Galaxy J series. It was released in Taiwan in July 2017.

Hardware 
The smartphone is equipped with a Samsung Exynos 7870 SoC integrated with a 14 nm process, and consists of 8 ARM Cortex-A 53 cores, Mali-T830MP1 GPU, 3 GB of memory And 32 GB storage space, the maximum can be expanded to 256 GB MicroSD memory card, support 4G + 3G dual card dual standby, the battery is non-removable 3600mAh, in order to be able to use Samsung Pay The entry-level models of have three card slots like the previous generation Samsung Galaxy J5 Prime.

Software 
The Samsung Galaxy J5 Pro runs the One UI interface based on the Android 9 Pie operating system.

References 

Samsung Galaxy
Discontinued smartphones